Armageddon, or Armageddon: A Novel of Berlin, is a 1963 novel by Leon Uris about post-World War II Berlin and Germany. The novel starts in  London during World War II, and goes through to the Four Power occupation of Berlin and the Soviet blockade by land of the city's western boroughs. The description of the Berlin Airlift is quite vivid as is the inter-action between people of the five nations involved as the three major Western Allies rub along with the Soviet occupiers of East Berlin and East Germany. The book finishes with the end of the airlift but sets the scene for the following 40 years of Cold War.

The book explains some important consequences of defeating Nazi Germany:

 Division of territory into  four zones of occupation including the last minute trading of Saxony and Thuringia by the Western Allies in return for a presence in Berlin (again in four sectors) at the heart of what had been the Third Reich.
 How relationships between British, American, French and Russian individuals at a personal, a military and a political level developed and with Germans at a personal and political level, while  De-Nazifying Germans and identifying likely leaders to play their part in the re-building of the city of Berlin from the ruins.
 The effects of the Soviet Blockade of Berlin and the measures taken by US, British and French governments to supply West Berlin from the air. Specific air corridor and flight safety guarantee arrangements from the 1940s were still in place for every western civil flight in & out of Berlin until the early 1990s.

See also

 Allied-occupied Germany
 The Good German, another novel in the same setting

1963 American novels
Novels set during World War II
Novels by Leon Uris
Novels set in Berlin
American war novels
Berlin Blockade